What a Wonderful Place ( - Eize Makom Nifla) is a 2005 Israeli drama film directed by Eyal Halfon. It includes three seemingly unrelated storylines which intersect at the end, set in southern Tel Aviv, the Arabah and an unidentified Israeli urban suburb. The film deals with issues of trafficking of women and the lives of foreign workers in Israel.

Awards and nominations
  Ophir Awards:
 Best Film (won)
 Best Actor (Uri Gavriel, won)
 Best Screenplay (Eyal Halfon, won)
 Best Art Direction (Ido Dolev, won)
 Best Editing (Einat Glaser-Zarhin, won)
 Best Director (Eyal Halfon, nominated)
 Best Actress (Evelyn Kaplun, nominated)
 Best Supporting Actor (Avi Uria, nominated)
 Best Supporting Actress (Marina Shoif, nominated)
 Best Cinematography (Nily Aslan, nominated)
 Best Costume Design (Keren Ron, nominated)
 Best Music (Avi Belleli, nominated)
 Best Sound (Israel David, David Lis and Aviv Aldema, nominated)
  40th Karlovy Vary International Film Festival:
 Crystal Globe (nominated)
 Special Jury Prize (won)
 Best Actor (Uri Gavriel, won)
  Festroia International Film Festival:
 Golden Dolphin (won)
  Brooklyn International Film Festival:
 Best Screenplay (Eyal Halfon, won''')

External links
Eyal Halfon, "We have decided to grant you the award, in spite of it all",Eretz Acheret Magazine

2005 films
Israeli drama films
2000s Hebrew-language films